The name of Bosnia is commonly used in English language as an exonym Bosnia, representing the South Slavic common endonym Bosna (or "Босна" in Cyrillic script). The name was first recorded during the 10th century, in the Greek form Βόσονα, designating the region. In following centuries, the name was used as a designation for a medieval polity, called the Banate of Bosnia and transformed by 1377 into the Kingdom of Bosnia. After the Ottoman conquest in 1463, the name was adopted and used as a designation for the Sanjak of Bosnia and Eyalet of Bosnia. After the Austro-Hungarian occupation in 1878, the region of Bosnia was reorganized jointly with the neighbouring region of Herzegovina, thus forming the dual name of Bosnia and Herzegovina.

From the name of Bosnia, various local terms (demonyms) have been derived designating its population. The South Slavic endonym Bošnjani (or "Бошњани" in Cyrillic script) was used during the 14th and 15th century in order to denote local population of the Banate of Bosnia and its successor, the Kingdom of Bosnia. During the Ottoman period various Turkish-language variations of the root Bosna were used as demonyms (such as ). Terms like "Bosniacs" or "Bosniaks" and "Bosnians" were also used as common demonyms, denoting all inhabitants of Bosnia, regardless of their ethnicity or religion. By the end of the 20th century, the term Bosniaks was selected, and adopted as an ethnonym by the political leadership of Bosnian Muslims, who are since then known as ethnic Bosniaks.

Etymology
The name of the polity of Bosnia as per traditional view in linguistics originated as a hydronym, the name of the Bosna river, believed to be of pre-Slavic origin.

The river may have been mentioned for the first time in the 1st century AD by Roman historian Marcus Velleius Paterculus under the name Bathinus flumen. Another basic source associated with the hydronym Bathinus is the Salonitan inscription of the governor of Dalmatia, Publius Cornelius Dolabella, where it is stated that the Bathinum river divides the Breuci from the Osseriates. Some scholars also connect the Roman road station Ad Basante, first attested in the 5th century Tabula Peutingeriana, to Bosnia. According to the English medievalist William Miller in the work Essays on the Latin Orient (1921), the Slavic settlers in Bosnia "adapted the Latin designation [...] Basante, to their own idiom by calling the stream Bosna and themselves Bosniaks [...]".
According to philologist Anton Mayer the name Bosna could essentially be derived from Illyrian Bass-an-as(-ā) which would be a diversion of the Proto-Indo-European root *bhoĝ-, meaning "the running water". The Croatian linguist, and one of the world's foremost onomastics experts, Petar Skok expressed an opinion that the chronological transformation of this hydronym from the Roman times to its final Slavicization occurred in the following order; *Bassanus> *Bassenus> *Bassinus> *Bosina> Bosьna> Bosna. Other theories involve the rare Latin term Bosina, meaning boundary, and possible Slavic and Thracian origins.

In the Slavic languages, -ak is a common suffix appended to words to create a masculine noun, for instance also found in the ethnonym of Poles (Polak) and Slovaks (Slovák). As such, "Bosniak" is etymologically equivalent to its non-ethnic counterpart "Bosnian" (which entered English around the same time via the Middle French, Bosnien): a native of Bosnia.

Medieval terms for Bosnia and its population

The demonym "Bosnians" is attested since the medieval Bosnian kingdom, referring to its inhabitants. By the 15th century, the suffix -(n)in had been replaced by -ak to create the form Bošnjak (Bosniak). Bosnian king Tvrtko II in his 1440 delegation to Polish king of Hungary, Władysław Warneńczyk (r. 1440–44), asserted that the ancestors of the Bosnians and Poles were the same, and that they speak the same language.

Terminology from the Ottoman period
The Sanjak of Bosnia and Bosnia Eyalet existed during Ottoman rule. The population was called in Turkish as Boşnaklar, Bosnalilar, Bosnavi, taife-i Boşnakiyan, Boşnak taifesi, Bosna takimi, Boşnak milleti, Bosnali or Boşnak kavmi, while their language was called Boşnakça.

The 17th-century Ottoman traveler and writer Evliya Çelebi reports in his work Seyahatname of the people in Bosnia as natively known as Bosnians. However, the concept of nationhood was foreign to the Ottomans at that time – not to mention the idea that Muslims and Christians of some military province could foster any common supra-confessional sense of identity. The inhabitants of Bosnia called themselves various names: from "Bosnian", in the full spectrum of the word's meaning with a foundation as a territorial designation, through a series of regional and confessional names, all the way to modern-day national ones. In this regard, Christian Bosnians had not described themselves as either Serbs or Croats prior to the 19th century according to researcher R. Donia and John V. A. Fine.

"Bosniaks" as a demonym in Early modern Western use
According to the Bosniak entry in the Oxford English Dictionary, the first preserved use of "Bosniak" in English was by British diplomat and historian Paul Rycaut in 1680 as Bosnack, cognate with post-classical Latin Bosniacus (1682 or earlier), French Bosniaque (1695 or earlier) or German Bosniak (1737 or earlier). The modern spelling is contained in the 1836 Penny Cyclopaedia V. 231/1: "The inhabitants of Bosnia are composed of Bosniaks, a race of Sclavonian origin".

Bosniak ethnonym
During Yugoslavia, the term "Muslims" was used for Bosnia and Herzegovina's Muslim population. In 1993, "Bosniak" was adopted by the Bosnian Muslim leadership as the name of the Bosnian Muslim nationality.

References

Sources

 
 
 
 
 

Bosnia
History of Bosnia and Herzegovina
Bosniak people